Following Uzbekistan's  independence from the Soviet Union, Turkey has been especially active in pursuing economic projects and social, cultural, and diplomatic initiatives in Uzbekistan. On December 16, 1991 Turkey was the first country to recognize Uzbekistan and among the first to open an embassy in Tashkent.

During the early 1990s, Turkey has made early commitments for expansion of trade and cooperation, funding Uzbek development schemes with a US$700 million (worth $1.3 billion USD in 2020) credit and pledging yearly 2,000 scholarships for Uzbek students to study in Turkey.

Since then, Turkey and Uzbekistan have developed a strong relationship with more than 100 bilateral agreements and protocols concluded between the two countries. Uzbekistan, as the only Central Asian state bordering on all other countries, is important to the Turkish commitment in ensuring stability, prosperity, and security in Central Asia.

Since gaining independence, Uzbek wariness of Russian influence led Uzbekistan to seek closer ties with other countries. The cultural kinship and proximity of Turkey has encouraged close relations and allowed to create relations  with its immediate Central Asian neighbors, Russia and other nations of the CIS.

Both Turkey and Uzbekistan is full member of Organization of Turkic States. Turkey is a participant to the political entity since the Nakhchivan Agreement at 2009 and Uzbekistan joined as a full-fledged member at 2019.

Economic relations 
Trade volume between the two countries was 2.3 billion USD in 2019.
There are around 1,300 companies with Turkish capital in Uzbekistan.

Presidential visits

See also 

 Foreign relations of Turkey
 Foreign relations of Uzbekistan
 Mendirman Jaloliddin

References 

 
Turkey
Uzbekistan